Akkarai S. Subhalakshmi is a 21st-century violinist in the field of Carnatic music. She is the daughter of violinist Akkarai Swaminathan. She and her younger musician sister Sornalatha are often referred to as Akkarai sisters in music circles.

Life and career

Akkarai S Subhalakshmi is a South Indian classical (Carnatic) violinist and vocalist.

Subhalakshmi hails from a musical family. Her grandfather Suchindram S P Sivasubramanian was a prolific musician and composer, and her grandmother R Sornambal a harikatha exponent and music teacher. Subhalakshmi is the disciple of her father, Akkarai S Swamynathan, a veteran violinist and founder of the Swara Raga Sudha school of music, and his intensive training enabled her to debut as a performing violinist and vocalist at the age of eight. She also trained under V Janakiraman, O V Subramanian and his daughter Padma Natesan of New Delhi, and later on, Padmabhushan P S Narayanaswamy and Chitravina N Ravikiran, who had her in many of his concerts and provided her with musical guidance and experience.

As an accompanist, she has played for many legendary artists such as M Balamuralikrishna, Chitravina N Ravikiran, T V Gopalakrishnan, N Ramani, Shashank Subramanyam, T. M. Krishna and R K Srikanthan.

Subhalakshmi has performed in Japan, Singapore, U.S.A., Canada, Germany, Italy, U.K., South Korea, the Middle East, Australia, Sri Lanka, and other places. She played in the Indo-Russian cultural exchange programme at age thirteen, and has been featured in prestigious events like the Théâtre de la Ville Festival (Paris), the farewell concert for Zubin Mehta in Munich, the Mahatma Gandhi Institute Sangeet Utsav in Mauritius, and the Cleveland Tyagaraja Aradhana. Subhalakshmi has also played in jugalbandi and fusion concerts with Chitravina Ravikiran, alongside artistes like Vishwa Mohan Bhatt and Ronu Majumdar. Subhalakshmi also performs many violin and vocal duets with her younger sister Akkarai S Sornalatha, and they are popularly known as ‘Akkarai Sisters’.

She received the Rajiv Gandhi Yuva Puraskar award from the President of India at the age of thirteen, and has since earned a host of awards, including Ustad Bismillah Khan Yuva Puraskar award from the Sangeet Natak Akademy (2007), Vani Kala Nipuna (2012), the Kalki Krishnamurthy Memorial Award (2007), Yuva Kala Bharathi (2002), the Shanmukha Shiromani (awarded to the sisters together in 2009), the Music Academy Outstanding Young Violinist Award (1999, 2001, 2006, & 2007). She was identified as one of India's 50 emerging stars by The Week magazine's issue commemorating the Indian nation's 50th anniversary. She is an A-Grade Artiste of All India Radio.

Subhalakshmi has released many albums, both violin and vocal, such as ‘Keeravani’ and ‘Varali’, and violin duet albums with her sister, such as ‘Inta Saukhyam’.

Awards and honours
 Kala Bhushan
 Kala Shree
 Sangeethavisharada
 Rajiv-Gandhi Puraskar
 Rajiv Gandhi Youth Award
 Isai-Kuil
 Delhi State First Award
 Outstanding young violinist award from The Music Academy (1999 and 2001)
 Inspiring Child Artist Award from Valayapatti Nadaayala (1999)
 Critic K.S. Mahadevan Award from Narada Gana Sabha (2000)
 The Best Performance Award from The Music Academy (2000)
 The Best Violinist Award from The Indian Fine Arts Society (2001)
 The Best Violinist of the year 2001 has been awarded by the writer Sujatha in Anandha Vikatan
 The Youth Merit Award 2002 has been awarded by The Rotary Club of Madras Industrial City
 The Yuva Kala Bharathi Award has been awarded by Bharat Kalachar (2002).
 The Ustad Bismillah Khan Yuva Puraskar award from the Sangeet Natak Akademy (2007)
 Vani Kala Nipuna (2012)
 The Kalki Krishnamurthy Memorial Award (2007)
 The Shanmukha Shiromani Award
 Kala Rathna from The Cleveland Aradhana Committee, 2013
Kalaimamani Award to Akkarai Subhalakshmi & her younger sister Akkarai Sornalatha together from Tamil Nadu State Government (2019)

References

External links

 Official Website
 Hindu Article about Akkarai Subhalakshmi

Living people
Carnatic violinists
21st-century violinists
Year of birth missing (living people)
Women violinists